General Persson may refer to:

Anders Persson (Swedish Air Force officer)  (born 1968), Swedish Air Force brigadier general
Lars G. Persson (born 1937), Swedish Coastal Artillery lieutenant general
Lars-Bertil Persson (born 1934), Swedish Air Force major general

See also
Thomas Person (1733–1800), North Carolina Militia brigadier general in the American Revolutionary War
Nils Personne (1918–2013), Swedish Air Force lieutenant general
Wilton Persons (1896–1977), U.S. Army major general